Romário Pereira Sipião (born 10 August 1985), commonly known as Romário, is a Brazilian and Sweden footballer who plays for Kalmar FF as a midfielder.

Romário scored his first goal for GAIS against Helsingborgs IF in October 2010, a crucial goal in the fight for the title, since the goal ultimately cost Helsingborg three points against title rivals Malmö FF.
Romário is famous for good passing and ball handling skills, but can sometimes be hot-headed and receive red cards, seemingly from nowhere.
In early 2019 he prolonged his contract with Kalmar FF for another 4.5 years.

After the 2022 season, he has played 271 matches in Allsvenskan for Kalmar FF, this puts him in second place of all time among KFF-players in the Swedish top-flight.

References

External links
 Profile on the Kalmar FF website

1985 births
Living people
Brazilian footballers
Association football midfielders
GAIS players
Kalmar FF players
Allsvenskan players
Brazilian expatriate footballers
Expatriate footballers in Sweden
Brazilian expatriate sportspeople in Sweden